The al Ahamir massacre refers to the incident where between 10 and 14 Iraqis were killed by Al Qaeda on or around the date of June 29, 2007, in al Ahamir, a city on the  outskirts of Baquba, Iraq.  Allegedly all of those killed were civilians.

External links
 al Ahamir massacre

2007 murders in Iraq
June 2007 events in Iraq
June 2007 crimes
History of Diyala Governorate
Massacres in 2007
Massacres in Iraq
Al-Qaeda activities in Iraq
Islamic terrorist incidents in 2007